Henry "Harry" Wilkinson (born 1883) was an English footballer who played in either outside-forward position.

Born in Bury, Lancashire, Wilkinson played for Newton Heath Alliance of the Manchester League, where he won a runners-up medal. Wilkinson signed professional forms with Manchester United in December 1903 but was allowed to move to Hull City, who at that point were only competing in friendly games. When Hull joined the Second Division, United demanded £150 for his transfer, a sum the Yorkshire club were unable to afford. With West Ham United competing in the Southern League, outside of the Football League structure and not bound by their rules, they were able to sign Wilkinson for nothing.

He made his Hammers debut on 16 September 1905 in a 1–2 defeat against Luton Town at Upton Park and made 15 league appearances for the club.

He later played for Haslingden, Bury, Oswaldtwistle Rovers, and Rochdale.

References

External links
MUFCInfo.com profile

1883 births
Year of death missing
Footballers from Bury, Greater Manchester
English footballers
Association football outside forwards
Manchester United F.C. players
Hull City A.F.C. players
West Ham United F.C. players
Haslingden F.C. players
Bury F.C. players
Oswaldtwistle Rovers F.C. players
Rochdale A.F.C. players